Erkin Adylbek Uulu (born February 14, 1991) is a Kyrgyzstani boxer. He is 1.9m tall (6'3ft). He competed at the 2016 Summer Olympics in the men's light heavyweight event, in which he was eliminated in the round of 32 by Juan Carlos Carrillo. He was the flag bearer for Kyrgyzstan at the Parade of Nations.

References

External links 
 
 
 
 

1991 births
Living people
Kyrgyzstani male boxers
Olympic boxers of Kyrgyzstan
Boxers at the 2016 Summer Olympics
Light-heavyweight boxers